Domenico Giambonini (11 November 1868 – 8 August 1956) was a Swiss sport shooter who competed in the 1920 Summer Olympics. He was born in Lugano and died in Bellinzona.

In 1920 he won a bronze medal as member of the Swiss team in the team 30 metre military pistol competition. He was also part of the Swiss team which finished ninth in the team 50 metre free pistol competition.

References

1868 births
1956 deaths
Swiss male sport shooters
ISSF pistol shooters
Olympic shooters of Switzerland
Shooters at the 1920 Summer Olympics
Olympic bronze medalists for Switzerland
Olympic medalists in shooting
Medalists at the 1920 Summer Olympics
Sportspeople from Lugano
People from Bellinzona
20th-century Swiss people